Merritt House may refer to:

Merritt House (Greenbrier, Arkansas), listed on the National Register of Historic Places (NRHP) in Faulkner County
S.D. Merritt House, Greenbrier, Arkansas, NRHP-listed in Faulkner County
Josiah Merritt Adobe, Monterey, California, also known as Merritt House, NRHP-listed in Monterey County
Dallam-Merritt House, San Francisco, California, NRHP-listed in San Francisco
Merritt-Ragan House, Hawkinsville, Georgia, NRHP-listed  in Pulaski County
Merritt-Hardin House, Bowling Green, Kentucky, NRHP-listed  in Warren County
Captain Merritt House, Bath, Maine, NRHP-listed in Sagahadoc County, Maine
Merritt-Winstead House, Roxboro, North Carolina, NRHP-listed  in Person County
John W. Merritt House and Store, Central Point, Oregon, NRHP-listed in Jackson County
Samuel T. Merritt House, Hudson, Wisconsin, NRHP-listed in St. Croix County